is a Japanese manga artist and illustrator. He attended College of Economics at Nihon University. His spouse is manga artist Reiko Yano.

He cites artists such as Shinji Wada, Fumio Hisamatsu, Shotaro Ishinomori, and Mitsuteru Yokoyama as his influences.

Biography
 was born January 19, 1959, in Saitama Prefecture, Japan. He attended and graduated from Nihon University in the College of Economics.

His professional manga debut,  (using the pen name Izumi Takemoto), appeared in the August 1981 issue of Nakayoshi, though it wasn't published in book form until 2003. All of his professional manga and illustration work has appeared using the name "Izumi Takemoto". In an interview with BookScan, Takemoto cited artists such as Shinji Wada, Fumio Hisamatsu, Shotaro Ishinomori, and Mitsuteru Yokoyama as his influences. His first experience with science fiction was through the works of Edgar Rice Burroughs, and the majority of his works reflect this SF influence. He is also a cat lover, and while cats frequently appear in his works, he had never owned a cat until 2003. He used his first experiences with his cat when he wrote Aru Hi no Zwei.

Takemoto's works have been nominated seven times for the Seiun Award in the Best Comic category but never won the award. His third published manga, Aoi-chan Panic! (1983-1984), was nominated in 1985. In 2002,  (1995-2001) was nominated.

Works
All works are listed chronologically within each section.

Audio albums
These are either soundtrack albums for Takemoto's games or audio drama albums based on his manga.
  (July 1994)
  (May 1994)
  (January 1996)
  (February 1997)
  (April 2006)
  (February 2008)
  (December 2009)
Contains music from Hataraku Shōjo: Tekipaki Workin' Love, Neko Mēwaku, and Rupupu Cube Lup Salad games from Datam Polystar.

Cover and other illustrations
Takemoto illustrated these works:
  by Osamu Kudō, based on Takemoto's manga
 Volume 1 (November 1996, Takeshobo)
 Volume 2 (January 1997, Takeshobo)
  by Ryunosuke Kingetsu (March 1999, Movic), based on Takemoto's manga

Games
Takemoto has had several works produced as games for various platforms. They are listed chronologically.
  (January 1993, Mega-CD)
 Yumimi Mix (1993, FM-Towns)
  (July 1995, Saturn)
  (1995, Arcade)
  (August 1996, PlayStation (SLPS-00416))
  (March 1997, PC Engine)
  (March 1997, FM Towns)
 Para PAR∀ Paradise (August 1997, Windows 95)
  (February 1997, Saturn (T-4503G))
 Hataraku Shōjo: Tekipaki Workin' Love FX (March 1998, PC-FX)
 Yumimi Mix Remix (March 1998, Windows 95)
 Dino Island (April 1998, Windows 95)
  (October 1999, interactive comic, PlayStation (SLPS-02354))
 Click Manga: Click no Hi (October 1999, interactive comic, Windows 95/98)
 Rupupu Cube Lup Salad DS (January 2008, Nintendo DS)
  (January 2010, PSP (ULJM-05520))
  (June 2020, iOS / Android)

Manga
  (1981 in Nakayoshi, Kodansha)
  (1982 in Nakayoshi, Kodansha)
  (1983-1984 in Nakayoshi, Kodansha)
  (1984 in Nakayoshi, Kodansha)
  (1984-1985 in Nakayoshi, Kodansha)
  (1985-1986 in Nakayoshi, Kodansha)
  (1986-1987 in Nakayoshi, Kodansha)
  (1988 in Nakayoshi, Kodansha)
  (1990-1992 in Comic Master, Hobby Japan)
  (1990-1991 in Be Love Parfait, Kodansha)
  (1991-2004 in Apple Fantasy and Apple Mystery, Ohzora/Mugenkan)
  (1992, Shufu to Seikatsu Sha)
  (1992-1997 in Comic Master EX, Comic Master, and RPG Magazine, Hobby Japan)
  (1993-1994 in Apple Mystery, Ohzora)
  (1993-1994 in Young Animal, Hakusensha)
  (2004, Hakusensha)
  (2018, Hakusensha)
  (1993-1995 in Haoh, Media Works)
  (1993-1995, ASCII)
  (1993-1996 in Comic Ganma, Takeshobo)
  (1995, Shufu to Seikatsu Sha)
  (1995-2001 in Monthly ASCII Comic and Comic Beam, ASCII/Enterbrain)
  (1996-1997, Ohzora)
  (1997, Ohzora)
  (1997, Ohzora)
  (1997, Ohzora)
  (1997-1998 in Nora Comics DX, Gakken)
  (1999-2004 in Monthly Comic Flapper, Media Factory)
  (1999-2012 in Manga Life, Takeshobo)
  (2001, Ohzora)
  (2001-2006 in Comic Beam, Enterbrain)
  (2003, Tokuma Shoten)
  (2004-2008 in Monthly Comic Flapper, Media Factory)
  (2005 in Manga Time Kirara, Houbunsha)
  (2006, SB Creative)
 {{nihongo|Variety Mornin'''|バラエティも〜にん|Baraeti Mōnin}} (2006-2010 in Manga Time Kirara Carat, Houbunsha)
  (2006-2009 in Gēmaga, SB Creative)
  (2006-2009 in Comic Beam, Enterbrain)
 MAGI×ES' (2007-2009 in Monthly Comic Flapper, Media Factory)
  (2009 in Peach Comics, Gakken)
Later re-published and continued 2013-current in Pet Comics from Shusuisha and Daitosha)
  (2009-2011 in Monthly Comic Flapper, Media Factory)
  (2009-2013 in Comic Beam, Enterbrain)
  (2010-2013 in Manga Time Kirara, Manga Time Kirara Carat, and Manga Time Kirara Ichimaru Ichimaru, Houbunsha)
  (2011-2012 in Manga Time Kirara, Houbunsha)
  (2012-2020 in Manga Life, Takeshobo)
  (2013, Takeshobo)
  (2013-2014 in Comic Beam, Enterbrain)
  (2015-2016 in Comic Beam'', Enterbrain)
  (2016, Daitosha)

Awards and recognition
Takemoto has been nominated seven times for the Seiun Award in the Best Comic category but didn't win.

References

External links
 Himawari House (official site (archived), in Japanese)
 UjaUja.net (unofficial fan site, in English)
 Izumi Takemoto at MobyGames

1959 births
Japanese illustrators
Japanese science fiction writers
Living people
Manga artists from Saitama Prefecture
People from Saitama Prefecture
Nihon University alumni